Agnes Charbonneau was an American educator and politician.

Born in Ironwood, Michigan, Charbonneau went to Bessemer High School and then received her bachelor's degree from Northwestern University in physical education and public speaking. She lived in Superior, Wisconsin and was involved in club work and public affairs. She served in the Wisconsin State Assembly, in 1931, and was a member of the Republican Party.

Notes

Year of birth unknown
Year of death unknown
People from Ironwood, Michigan
Politicians from Superior, Wisconsin
Northwestern University alumni
Women state legislators in Wisconsin
Republican Party members of the Wisconsin State Assembly